Jayakodige Dona Geetha Kanthi (born November 28, 1957 as ), popularly as Geetha Kanthi Jayakody, is an actress in Sri Lankan cinema. theater and television. She is also a dubbing artist.

Personal life
Geetha Kanthi Jayakody was born on 28 November 1957 as the second of the family. Her father was an Ayurvedic doctor. She completed education from Siddhartha Maha Vidyalaya, Wellampitiya. She has one older brother, one younger brother, Piyal and two younger sisters - Sriyani and Rathna Lalani. Rathna Lalani Jayakody is also a renowned award-winning actress in Sri Lankan cinema, theater and television. Rathna Lalani is married to fellow actor Sampath Tennakoon. Popular actor Bimal Jayakody is the son of Geetha's older brother. Bimal is married to fellow actress Sujani Menaka. Geetha's sister, Sriyani Muditha  has one son, Yash Weerasinghe. Yash is a popular actor in television.

Jayakody has one daughter - Paboda Sanedepani. She is also a popular award-winning actress. When Paboda was just five years old, they both acted in the teledrama Yashorawaya. Then they acted together in teledrama Bopath Sakkiya. After 31 years, they acted together in the upcoming film Sri Saddha.

Career
Before starting acting career, Jayakody joined with Sri Lanka Broadcasting Coorporation for Lama Pitiya program. At about 21 years, she performed Ambika Geethayen Geethaya program as a radio relief announcer. While at the Lamapitiya, she played as Catherine Kumari in Bandula Withanage's drama Lanka Kathawa. Her first acting came through stage drama Kelani Palama as a school girl Surangani. During its second production of Kolam drama Sakkhaya Dhitti by Lucien Bulathsinhala, Gamini Samarakoon starred as 'Gamaya' and Geetha Kanthi Jayakody as 'Gama Hamine'. The role 'Daisy' in the stage play Rhinoceros (1986), directed by veteran writer Kapila Kumara Kalinga, is one of the highlights of Geetha Kanthi's drama.

Later, she joined the play Veniciye Welenda for a brief period. At the age about 18 years, she played the role village girl in television play Hath Pana. Her maiden television direction came through Ashirwada which was telecasted on Esala Poya Day through TV Derana in 2012.

Selected television serials

 Adarawanthayo
 Ahasin Watuna Gahaniyak 
 Bath Amma
 Bopath Sakkiya
 Dawena Maw
 Doratu Rakinno 
 Gal Pilimaya Saha Bol Pilimaya
 Hansa Pihatu
 Hima Piyali
 Indrachapa 
 Ira Handa Payana Lokaya
 Kemmura
 Kiriammawaru
 Laabai Apple
 Mathaka Sulanga
 Mayavi 
 Mayura Asapuwa 
 Meda Gedara
 Miringuwen Eha
 Nenala <ref>{{cite web |url=http://www.sarasaviya.lk/teledramas/2020/09/24/19033/නාලන්ගේ-නෑනලා-රූපවාහිනියට-එති |title=Nalan's 'Nenala come on TV |publisher=Sarasaviya |access-date=24 September 2017}}</ref>
 Nil Nethu Pem Piyawara Passe Gena Manamali Pingala Danawwa Podi Mama Ran Doratuwa Raja Bhavana Sakwa Lihiniyo Sausiri Uyana Sepalika Sinasenna Mata Siri Sirimal 
 Sneha Thunpath Ratawaka Lassana 
 Visula Ahasa Yata YashorawayaSelected stage dramas

 Kelani Palama Ahasin Watunu Minissu Mala Walalu Rhinoceros Sakkhaya DhittiFilmography
Her maiden cinematic experience came through a main role in 1982 film Ridee Nimnaya, directed by D.B. Nihalsinghe, which earned nominations for the Best actress in that year. Some of her popular films are Ridee Nimnaya, Parawarthana and Gamani.

Awards and accolades
She has won several awards at the local stage drama festivals and television festivals.

Sumathi Awards

|-
|| 2001 ||| Kemmura'' || Best Supporting Actress ||

References

External links
 Rohana Siriwardena to enchant fans on Sep. 28
 වම් අතත් බිඳුණා

Living people
Sri Lankan film actresses
1957 births